Strength Through Vengeance is third full-length album by Canadian heavy metal band, A Perfect Murder. It is their first album featuring lead singer Kevin Randel.

Track listing
 "Strength Through Vengeance" – 5:29
 "Black Hate Machine" – 4:49
 "Wake Up And Die" – 3:01
 "Snake Eyes" – 4:15
 "Path Of Resistance" – 2:24
 "Deceit Of Man" – 4:16
 "Body And Blood" – 3:07
 "Rotten I" – 2:39
 "Suffocation Of Thought" – 3:34
 "Time Changes Nothing" – 5:39
 "Slay The Masses" – 3:40

A Perfect Murder on this recording:

Carl Bouchard - Rhythm & Lead GuitarsYan Chausse - DrumsKevin Randel - VocalsDave B - BassPierre Remillard - Rhythm Guitar

Engineered by Pierre RemillardMixed by Pierre Remillard @ Wild StudioMastered by Howie Weinberg @ MasterDisk, New York

A Perfect Murder (band) albums
2005 albums
Victory Records albums